Coffee tea refers to herbal tea made from non-bean parts of the coffea (coffee plant), and may refer to:
 Coffee-leaf tea
 Coffee cherry tea
 Ground coffee, brewed in a coffee bag, like bagged tea, is referred to simply as "coffee", and is similar to filter coffee.
 Yuanyang (drink), a drink combining coffee and tea

Coffee derivatives
Herbal tea